Tenevil (ca. 1890–1943?) was a Chukchi reindeer herder, living in the tundra near the settlement of Ust-Belaya in Russian province of Chukotka. 

Around 1927 or 1928 he independently invented a writing system for the Chukchi language. It has never been established with certainty whether the symbols in this writing system were ideograms/pictograms or whether the system was logogram-based. Researchers have noted the abstract character of the symbols, which may be an indirect evidence that this writing system is entirely Tenevil's invention.

Tenevil's writing system was first described by the Russian ethnographer and writer Waldemar Bogoras in 1930. The writing system was never widely known: it was used entirely within Tenevil's family encampment. Apart from Tenevil himself, the writing system was used by his son, with whom he exchanged messages during shifts away at the reindeer pastures. Tenevil wrote his symbols on boards, bones, walrus tusks, and candy wrappers.

This writing system is a unique phenomenon, and has wider significance to the research into the origins of writing traditions in the cultures in the pre-state stage of development. Tenevil's Chukchi writing system is the most northerly of all such systems to be developed by indigenous people with minimal outside influence.

The sources and prototype of the Tenevil writing system are unknown. Taking into consideration the isolation of Chukotka from the regional centres of civilization, it could be considered a localized creative initiative of a lone genius. It is possible the writing system is influenced by the decorations on shamans' drums. The word writing (kelikel) in the Chukchi language has Tungusic parallels.

In 1945 the artist and art historian I. Lavrov visited the upper reaches of the Anadyr River where Tenevil had lived. There he discovered the "Tenevil archive": a box, buried in the snow, containing relics of Tenevil's writing. Tenevil also developed symbols for numerals, using the base 20 counting system of the Chukchi language. About 1000 basic elements of the Tenevil writing system have been identified.

The Chukchi writer Yuri Rytkheu dedicated his 1969 novel A Dream in Polar Fog to Tenevil.

See also
 Sequoyah
 Uyaquq

External links
 http://www.rbardalzo.narod.ru/4/chukot.html

Sources
 The original version of this page was translated from the

Chukchi people
1890s births
1943 deaths
Creators of writing systems
Soviet inventors
People from Chukotka Autonomous Okrug